The Dutch Eredivisie in the 1983–84 season was contested by 18 teams. Feyenoord won the championship.

League standings

Results

See also
 1983–84 Eerste Divisie
 1983–84 KNVB Cup

References

 Eredivisie official website - info on all seasons 
 RSSSF

Eredivisie seasons
Netherlands
1